Mai: A Mother's Rage or simply known as Mai is a 2022 Indian Hindi-language family thriller drama streaming television series on Netflix created by Atul Mongia, directed by Anshai Lal and produced by Anushka Sharma with her elder brother Karnesh Ssharma under the banner of Clean Slate Filmz. The series stars Sakshi Tanwar, Wamiqa Gabbi, Prashant Narayanan, Raima Sen, Anant Vidhat Sharma and Vaibhav Raj Gupta in lead roles. It follows a story of a grieving mother who discovers the criminals behind her daughter's tragic death, and transforms from meek to merciless to get the real cause behind death. The series premiered on 15 April 2022 on Netflix.

Synopsis 
Sheel Chaudhary, a middle-class mother and a nurse working at Geeta Bhawan, an old age home, witnesses the death of her daughter, Supriya, by a speeding truck. During the post-funeral ceremonies, she stumbles upon the fact that her daughter's death was not an accident, but a case of pre-planned murder. The tragedy pushes the mourning mother to uncover the truth about the death of her daughter.

Cast
 Sakshi Tanwar as Sheel Chaudhary
 Wamiqa Gabbi as Supriya Chaudhary
 Raima Sen as Neelam
 Prashant Narayanan as Jawahar Vyas/Mohandas Vyas (Twin Brother)
 Vivek Mushran as Yash Chaudhary
 Ankur Ratan as SP Farooque Siddiqui
 Saurabh Dubey as Raghu
 Vaibhav Raj Gupta as Shankar
 Anant Vidhaat Sharma as Prashant
 Seema Pahwa as Kalpana
 Mikhail Gandhi as Archit Chaudhary
 Akash Khurana as Vishnu Goyal
 Rashmi Seth as Kusum Vyas
 Ikhlaque Khan as Dr. Chaudhary
 Anubha Fatehpuria as Mrs. Chaudhary
 Sandeepa Dhar as Inaya Siddiqui
 Sarika Singh as Meenu
 Omkar Jaiprakash as Keshav
 Amit Singh Thakur as Jayesh Desai
 Siddhant Mahajan as Vikram
 Vishwanath Kulkarni as Goayal's Goon

Episodes

Release 
The series was earlier announced by Netflix India  to release in 2021 but was delayed due to its pending post production work. It was finally released on 15 April 2022.

Reception

Critical response 
Shubhra Gupta from The Indian Express gave a positive review to the series stating, "Despite the elements that stretch our credulity, Sakshi Tanwar manages to hold our attention." Nandini Ramnath from Scroll.in wrote, "This netflix crime series is a boilerplate thriller ladled out on elegant dishes."

References

External links
 
 

Indian drama web series
Indian television series
Hindi-language Netflix original programming
Indian LGBT-related web series